The Oneonta Outlaws are a collegiate summer baseball team in the Perfect Game Collegiate Baseball League (PGCBL).

History

Previous Oneonta teams 
Oneonta, located just 30 minutes from the National Baseball Hall of Fame in Cooperstown, first appeared on the baseball map in 1890 with the Oneonta Indians and was a mainstay in the New York–Penn League (NYPL) for more than 40 years, beginning with the arrival of the Oneonta Red Sox in 1966. From 1967 to 2009 the team competed in NYPL as the Oneonta Yankees/Tigers, and won 12 league championships, the most among all league franchises.

On January 27, 2010, Oneonta Mayor Dick Miller announced in a press release saying that the Tigers would be leaving Oneonta for Norwich, Connecticut for the 2010 season, and essentially ending its run as a pro team.

Collegiate summer team 
In conjunction with team shifting operations to Norwich, the Saratoga Phillies transferred their rights in the wood-bat New York Collegiate Baseball League (NYCBL) to Oneonta, and announced that the team would play in Damaschke Field. The team would later be named "Outlaws".

After winning the 2011 NYCBL title, the team moved to the Perfect Game Collegiate Baseball League (PGCBL) for the 2012 season, but returned a year later after local businessman Gary Laing bought the team. The Outlaws won another NYCBL title in 2013, but rejoined the PGCBL before the 2016 season.

Season results

Notable alumni
 Artie Lewicki (2014)
 Carlos Asuaje (2013)
 Tom Murphy (2012)

 there are 41 Outlaws alumni who got drafted in the MLB Draft and 52 players that continued to pro career.

References

Baseball teams established in 1966